is a Japanese former professional footballer who played as a right-back. He earned 38 caps for the Japan national team between 1994 and 2003, including three games at the 1998 FIFA World Cup.

Club career
Narahashi was born in Chiba on November 26, 1971. After graduating from Chiba Eiwa High School in 1990, he joined Fujita Industries (later Bellmare Hiratsuka, Shonan Bellmare) playing in the Japan Soccer League Division 2. In 1992, Japan Soccer League was folded and the club joined new league Japan Football League. The club won the champions in 1993 and was promoted to J1 League. In 1994, the club won Emperor's Cup. In Asia, the club also won 1995 Asian Cup Winners' Cup.

Narahashi moved to Kashima Antlers in 1997. The presence of Jorginho at Kashima propelled his decision to move as he aspired to learn the trade under the Brazilian international full back. In 2000, the club won all three major title in Japan; J1 League, J.League Cup and Emperor's Cup first time in J.League history. The club won J1 League three times, J.League Cup three times and Emperor's Cup two times. From the mid 2000s, his opportunities to play decreased. At the end of the 2006 season, Kashima announced that they wouldn't renew his contract.

Narahashi returned to Bellmare in February 2007 but was released in August 2007. On February 1, 2008, he announced his retirement from professional football.

International career
On September 27, 1994, Narahashi debuted for Japan national team against Australia. He competed with Hiroshige Yanagimoto for regular of right side-back. Yanagimoto got hurt in 1997, Narahashi became a regular. At 1998 FIFA World Cup qualification, Japan won the qualify for 1998 FIFA World Cup first time in Japan's history. In 1998, he played in all three matches at 1998 World Cup.

After 2002 FIFA World Cup, in October, Narahashi was selected Japan by new manager Zico for the first time in four years. He was also selected Japan for 2003 FIFA Confederations Cup, but he did not play in the match. He played 38 games for Japan until 2003.

Career statistics

Club

International

Honors
Individual
 J1 League Best Eleven: 2001

References

External links

Japan National Football Team Database

1971 births
Living people
Association football people from Chiba Prefecture
Japanese footballers
Japan international footballers
Japan Soccer League players
J1 League players
J2 League players
Japan Football League (1992–1998) players
Shonan Bellmare players
Kashima Antlers players
1998 FIFA World Cup players
2003 FIFA Confederations Cup players
Association football defenders
Footballers at the 1994 Asian Games
Asian Games competitors for Japan